Jeffrey Daniel Phillips is an American actor and filmmaker.

Career
He is best known for playing a caveman in a popular series of GEICO commercials. He played the part of Maurice in the short-lived Cavemen sitcom on ABC. Other credits to him are Hide (2003), for which he was the director, producer, and co-author in addition to being a cast member; parts in Sneakers and Rob Zombie's Halloween II as Uncle Seymour, The Lords of Salem and 31; and roles in TV series Flaked, Arrest and Trial, Philly, and Profiler. He appeared in the second season of Agents of S.H.I.E.L.D. as David Angar, the Marvel Cinematic Universe version of Angar the Screamer.

Selected filmography

References

External links
 
 

American male television actors
Year of birth missing (living people)
Living people
American male screenwriters
American male film actors
American film directors